Metro Maalai (Tamil: மெட்ரோ மாலை) is a 2019 Malaysian Tamil-language indie romantic drama film. It tells the relationship of two souls, a rejected male guitarist and a neglected woman as they cross paths with each other in Kuala Lumpur.

It was released on 28 November 2019 in Malaysian cinemas, and received mixed reviews.

The film is available on legal streaming site Amazon Prime Video and Astro On Demand.

Synopsis 
In the buzzing Kuala Lumpur, a dejected but talented male guitarist crosses path with a neglected married woman. As they get closer, they develop attraction and also share their opinions on passion, religion, life. They have feelings for each other but remains as friends and questions eventually how their relationship might turn into an extra marital affair.

Cast 
Sathish as Anonymous Male
Punitha Shanmugam as Nithya
Karishma as Jasmine Vasudevan
Kumanavannan as Babu
Gennastasia as Nithya's friend
Kay

Songs 
The film includes the song "Azhagana Nyayiru".

Reception 
A critic from Varnam wrote that "Directors Haran Kaveri and Shobaan have tremendous potential, as seen in the first two acts of the film that’s simply oozing with detail. But the actors lack chemistry and the dialogue are mundane".

Awards and nominations 
Norway Tamil Film Festival - Best Social Awareness Tamil – Diaspora

See also 
 List of Malaysian Tamil films

References

External links
 

2019 films
Malaysian romantic drama films
Tamil-language Malaysian films